Anthony John Gray (born 14 June 1942 in Stoke-on-Trent), is a former Wales international rugby union player and former Head Coach of the Wales national rugby union team. A flanker, he played his club rugby for Newbridge and London Welsh.
As a coach he took the Welsh team to third place in the inaugural Rugby World Cup, a feat not yet equalled.

References

External links
Wales profile

1942 births
Living people
London Welsh RFC players
Newbridge RFC players
People educated at Friars School, Bangor
Rugby union players from Stoke-on-Trent
Wales international rugby union players
Wales national rugby union team coaches
Welsh rugby union coaches
Welsh rugby union players